Dennis Poppenhagen (born August 28, 1938) is an American politician and businessman.

Poppehhagen lived in Detroit Lakes, Minnesota with his wife and family. He went to Minnesota State University Moorhead and was involved in the insurance business. Poppenhagen served in the Minnesota House of Representatives from 1985 to 1990 and was a Republican.

References

1938 births
Living people
People from Detroit Lakes, Minnesota
Businesspeople from Minnesota
Minnesota State University Moorhead alumni
Republican Party members of the Minnesota House of Representatives